Ronald David Mael (born August 12, 1945) is an American musician, songwriter, composer and record producer. He is the keyboard player and principal songwriter in the band Sparks which he founded with vocalist, occasional songwriter and younger brother Russell Mael in 1971. Mael is known for his quirky and idiosyncratic approach to songwriting, his intricate and rhythmic keyboard playing style and for his deadpan and low key, scowling demeanour onstage often remaining motionless over his keyboard in sharp contrast to Russell's animated and hyperactive frontman antics. Ron Mael is also noted for his conservative clothes and unfashionable moustache. The Mael brothers are the founders of Lil' Beethoven Records.

Early life
Ronald David Mael was born on August 12, 1945, in Culver City, California. The Mael brothers grew up in Pacific Palisades – an affluent beach neighborhood of Los Angeles – with their father, Meyer Mael, who was a graphic designer and caricaturist for the Hollywood Citizen-News, and their mother, Miriam (née Moskowitz), a librarian. Both Meyer and Miriam were the children of Jewish immigrants, Meyer from Russia and Austria and Miriam from Poland; despite this, a source affiliated with the brothers' 2021 documentary stated that they "weren't raised, nor do they identify as Jewish", and the documentary does not mention their Jewish heritage. Much of the Mael brother's initial inspiration came from their father taking them to the cinema as children, where they developed an interest in film, visual arts and narrative. Meyer died when Mael was 11.

After being educated at Palisades High School, both brothers enrolled at UCLA; Ron began a course in cinema and graphic arts in 1963 while Russell studied theatre arts and filmmaking between 1966 and 1968. It was during their time at UCLA the brothers formed their first band, The Urban Renewal Project, who recorded a series of demos in 1967.

Sparks

Ron Mael plays the keyboards and synthesizers and writes most of the songs for Sparks. When the band hit the peak of its popularity in the 1970s, he was well known for his strange appearance, often remaining motionless over his keyboard in sharp contrast to Russell's animated and hyperactive frontman antics. Ron's conservative clothes and unfashionable, Charlie Chaplin-esque toothbrush moustache attracted much attention, as does his current pencil moustache. Onstage, Ron alternates between playing the keyboard and engaging in comic mime routines, often in connection with projections on backdrop.

For the first two albums with Halfnelson/Sparks, Mael played a Wurlitzer electronic piano, but found that it did not stand up to road use because the metal reeds broke frequently. When Sparks relocated to the UK, Mael began using an RMI Electra-Piano, played through an Echoplex tape echo unit, and this distinctive sound featured prominently on their breakthrough single "This Town Ain't Big Enough For The Both Of Us", the albums Kimono My House and Propaganda and in their live shows. Since 1981, he has used various Yamaha and Roland keyboards and synthesizers live. That year, he altered the Roland logo on the back of his Roland Jupiter-8 to read "Ronald", which he has done on all of his keyboards since then.  He currently uses a Yamaha Motif XF8.

The pair appeared as themselves in the 1977 disaster film Rollercoaster, performing live. They also appeared in episode twenty-two of season six of the Gilmore Girls.

In a rare non-Sparks related musical turn, Ron and Russell Mael wrote the lyrics to Telex's 1982 album, Sex.

In June 2018, Edgar Wright announced he would be making a documentary on the cult pop-rock band Sparks. He had covered the band's concert in London in May at O2 Forum Kentish Town. This concert would also be a part of the documentary. The film, The Sparks Brothers,  had its world premiere at the 2021 Sundance Film Festival on January 30, 2021.

Personal life
In 2017, a reviewer noted that while the brothers' biographies recount an LA childhood in which they surfed and were both models for mail order catalogues, their private lives are otherwise almost entirely unknown. "Well, we're in good company with Bob Dylan", was their reported response. "We feel the less you do know, it keeps the mythology and the image in a better position." Even to the question of whether they have partners or spouses, they refused to give an indication, insisting that "the vagueness is more interesting than the reality."

Discography
With Sparks

With FFS

References

External links
Official website

Ron Mael and Russell Mael Biography
The "Kimono My House" album files

1945 births
20th-century American musicians
21st-century American keyboardists
21st-century American musicians
American male songwriters
Record producers from California
American new wave musicians
American synth-pop musicians
Living people
People from Culver City, California
Songwriters from California
Sparks (band) members
20th-century American male musicians
21st-century American male musicians
FFS (band) members
American expatriates in the United Kingdom
American expatriates in France